Claremont College may refer to:

 Claremont Colleges, a consortium of seven schools located in Claremont, California, United States, which currently includes:
 Claremont McKenna College, known as Claremont Men's College from 1946 to 1981
 Claremont Graduate University, a private, all-graduate research university
 Claremont College (Tasmania), a secondary school in Hobart, Tasmania, Australia

See also
 Claremont Institute, a conservative think tank in Claremont, California
 Claremont (disambiguation)